Dead City may refer to:

 Dead City (film), a 1951 Greek film
 A song from the 1997 Patti Smith album Peace and Noise
 Minas Morgul, also known as "The Dead City", a fortress from Lord of the Rings universe
 A video game by Com2uS
 The Walking Dead: Dead City, a The Walking Dead spinoff series

See also
 Dead Cities
 The City of the Dead (disambiguation)
 Ghost town, a type of city that could be considered "dead"